Holbrook is an electoral division of West Sussex in the United Kingdom and returns one member to sit on West Sussex County Council. The current County Councillor, Peter Catchpole, is also Cabinet Member for Adults' Services.

Extent
The division covers the northern part of the town of Horsham.

It comprises the following Horsham District wards: Holbrook East Ward and Holbrook West Ward; and of the following civil parishes: the western part of North Horsham and the northern part of Horsham.

Election results

2013 Election
Results of the election held on 2 May 2013:

2009 Election
Results of the election held on 4 June 2009:

2005 Election
Results of the election held on 5 May 2005:

References
Election Results - West Sussex County Council

External links
 West Sussex County Council
 Election Maps

Electoral Divisions of West Sussex